Reginald Butler may refer to:
Sir Reginald Butler, 1st Baronet (1866–1933), English businessman.
Sir Thomas Butler, 2nd Baronet (1901–1959), his son, whose actual first name was also Reginald
Sir Michael Butler, 3rd Baronet (1928–2012), his grandson, whose actual first name was also Reginald
Sir Richard Michael Butler, 4th Baronet (born 1953), his great-grandson, whose actual first name is also Reginald
Reg Butler (1913–1981), English sculptor

See also
Butler (surname)